Kibdelosporangium phytohabitans is a bacterium from the genus Kibdelosporangium which has been isolated from seeds from the plant Jatropha curcas in Sichuan, China.

References

Pseudonocardiales
Bacteria described in 2012